Thunder Collins (born September 17, 1979) is a former running back for the Montreal Alouettes after playing 3 seasons at the University of Nebraska–Lincoln.  He played one game for the Montreal Alouettes of the Canadian Football League in 2003.

In August, 2009, Collins was convicted of 1st-degree murder. Later, Collins was found guilty of attempted 2nd-degree murder. Although Collins maintains his innocence, he has been sentenced to life in prison. His attorney's motion for a re-trial was denied in 2012.

References

External links 
 ESPN.com

1979 births
Living people
Nebraska Cornhuskers football players
Montreal Alouettes players
American people convicted of murder